The Viaducto de Montabliz (Viaduct of Montabliz) is a bridge located in the town of Montabliz, Cantabria, Spain. 

It was built by Ferrovial and was completed in 2008.

See also

List of highest bridges in the world

References

Road bridges in Spain
Buildings and structures in Cantabria
Transport in Cantabria